Louis Albrecht Kahlenberg (20 January 1870 – 18 March 1941) was an American chemist who contributed to electrochemistry, the study of ionic compounds, electrolytic disassociation of salts and studies in pharmaceutical chemistry. He served as a professor at the University of Wisconsin.

Kahlenberg was born in Two Rivers, Wisconsin where his father Albert and Bertha had immigrated from Germany. He studied at the local Lutheran school, the Two Rivers High School and then trained at the Oshkosh Normal School so as to become a teacher. He then went to the Milwaukee Normal School and then received a BS from the University of Wisconsin in 1892. He fellowship allowed him to continue studies and he received an MS in 1893. He then went to the University of Leipzig, studying under Wilhelm Ostwald and received a Ph.D. in 1895 for his work on the solubility of copper and lead tartarates. He returned to the US and became an instructor in physical chemistry and later moved to the pharmacy school. He became a full professor in 1901. During World War I, he was opposed to the American involvement leading to his demotion in the chemistry department from the position of head in 1919. He was considered a great teacher.

Kahlenberg married Lillan Belle Heald in 1896 and they had three children, including Herman who also studied chemistry under his father and began the Kahlenberg Laboratories where he produced a suturing material called "Equisetene".

References

External links 
 Outlines of chemistry; a textbook for college students (1918)
 Chemistry and its relations to daily life (1915, coauthored with E.B. Hart]
 Portrait
 Biography

1870 births
1941 deaths
American chemists
Presidents of the Electrochemical Society